The Swiss Verkehrskadetten Association (German Schweizerischer Verkehrskadetten Verband, often abbreviated to SVKV) is an association under Article 60 of the Swiss Civil Code. It is an umbrella organization for traffic cadets Departments (Verkehrskadetten-Abteilungen) in Switzerland. The association has a board, which is elected at the delegates' meeting. The board's job is to advocate for the traffic cadets Departments, and to control internal regulations.

Name Protection 
The brand "SVKV Schweizerischer Verkehrskadetten Verband" is registered in the Swiss trademark register. In addition, the brand "VKA Verkehrskadetten-Abteilung" has been registered by the SVKV. According to this, only member departments of SVKV may use the name "VKA Verkehrskadetten-Abteilung".

External links 
Swiss Verkehrskadetten Association (German)

Traffic law